PetroSA (The Petroleum, Oil and Gas Corporation of South Africa (SOC) Ltd.) is the national oil company (NOC) of South Africa. Its main activities are the extraction of natural gas from offshore fields about 89 km from Mossel Bay, the production of synthetic fuels from this gas through a gas to liquids (GTL) process, and the extraction of crude oil from oil fields off the South Coast of South Africa. The GTL Refinery is located in Mossel Bay. Its capacity is about 45 000 bpd and processes both the gas and condensate to produce liquid fuels and chemicals. The company is also involved in the exploration for and development of new sources of oil and gas.

History

PetroSA was formed in January 2002 from the merger of three previous entities: Mossgas (Pty) Limited, Soekor (Pty) Limited, and parts of the Strategic Fuel Fund Association. Soekor was divided into parts to provide staff for PetroSA and also for the Petroleum Agency of South Africa, otherwise known as PASA. Here are some of the key milestones leading up to this historic merger:

 1965 - Following the establishment of Soekor, the first land search for oil commences in Beaufort West, Western Cape. Small accumulations of oil are found, but they are non-commercial.  
 1969 - First offshore well drilled by Superior Group. Natural gas deposits are also discovered in the continental shelf complex off the Southern Cape coast.  
 1970 - Soekor commences offshore drilling in a joint venture with Rand Mines and US Natural Resources.  
 1973 - Soekor drills its own first offshore well.  
 1978 - Soekor terminates its land search for oil.  
 2002 - President Thabo Mbeki launches PetroSA, the Petroleum Oil and Gas Corporation of the Republic of South Africa.

Recent events 

 2017 - PetroSA signed $400m deal with Russian exploration company Rosgeo.
2018 – Energy Minister of South Africa Jeff Radebe rejected PetroSA's proposal to purchase 23 million barrels of oil from Kase Lawal for $1.52 billion over a 5-year period, deeming the deal too risky.

Soekor 
Soekor Pty Ltd. (from Suidelike Olie Eksplorasie Korporasie; 'Southern Oil Exploration Corporation') was South Africa's national oil company until 2002, when it was merged with Mossgas Pty Ltd to form PetroSA. Soekor was the operator and developer of the first oilfield development in South Africa, the Oribi field discovered in 1990. Soekor owned 80% of the field's exploration licensing.

Petroleum Agency of South Africa 
Petroleum Agency of South Africa (PASA) is the state-regulator in the field of on-shore and off-shore oil and gas exploration. In June 2018 PASA imposed temporary licensing restrictions in order to reform the country's oil and gas exploration licensing system.

Controversy 
The company was implicated in a corruption scandal, dubbed "Oilgate" by the media, when it was reported that it had transferred R11 million to the ruling African National Congress in the run-up to the 2004 elections.

Leadership

References

External links
 Official website

Oil and gas companies of South Africa
South Africa
Government-owned companies of South Africa
Companies based in Cape Town
Energy companies established in 1965
Non-renewable resource companies established in 1965